Peregrine Horden is professor in medieval history at Royal Holloway, University of London. Horden's research is in the area of Mediterranean cities and medicine in the Middle Ages. He is a Fellow of All Souls College, Oxford.

The publication of his book The Corrupting Sea: A Study of Mediterranean History (co-written with Nicholas Purcell) was hailed as a 'notable intellectual event'. The book's main thesis is that the Mediterranean is a region made up of micro-regions. The book argues that the Mediterranean ought to be seen in terms of the ecological lines of force linking countless small regions and micro-economies together rather than in terms of a few famous metropoleis. Horden and Purcell stress the longues durées and insist that the different themes of history, i.e. politics, culture, economy, ideas and institutions must be studied in close association.

Selected publications
Companion to Mediterranean History Horden, P. (ed.) & Kinoshita, S. (ed.) 2014, Oxford: Wiley-Blackwell.
The Body in Balance: Humoral Medicines in Practice Horden, P. (ed.) & Hsu, E. (ed.) 2013, Berghahn.
Hospitals and Healing from Antiquity to the Later Middle Ages Horden, P. 2008 Aldershot: Ashgate.
All Souls under the Ancien Régime: Politics, Learning and the Arts, c.1600–1850 Horden, P. (ed.) & Green, S. J. D. (ed.) 2007 Oxford: Oxford University Press.
Freedom of Movement in the Middle Ages, Proceedings of the Twentieth Harlaxton Symposium Horden, P. (ed.) 2007 Donington: Shaun Tyas.
The Impact of Hospitals 300-2000 Horden, P. (ed.), Henderson, J. (ed.) & Pastore, A. (ed.) 2007, Oxford: Peter Lang.
The Corrupting Sea: A Study of Mediterranean History Horden, P. & Purcell, N. 2000 Oxford: Blackwell.

References 

Academics of Royal Holloway, University of London
Living people
Year of birth missing (living people)
British historians
Fellows of All Souls College, Oxford